Blueprint is an album by Natalie MacMaster, released in 2003 on the Rounder Records label.

Track listing
 "A Blast" – 5:27
"Bishop Faber MacDonald's Strathspey"
"Frank & Julie Leahy's Strathspey"
"Maggie Cameron's Stratspey"
"Bill Burnett's Reel"
"Mrs. MacPherson of Invernan"
 "Appropriate Dipstick" – 3:31
 "Jig Party" – 4:02
Traditional Jig
"The Butlers of Glen Avenue"
"Tee Tie Tum Tittle Tee"
"Annette's Chatter"
 "Touch of the Master's Hand" – 3:14
 "Eternal Friendship" – 4:27
 "Gravel Shore" – 4:45
"Gravel Shore"
"Reel for Carl"
"The Street Player"
 "Devil and the Dirk" – 4:44
"The Carignan Clog"
"The Devil and the Dirk"
"Lord Gordon's Reel"
"Golden Lochs"
 "The Ewe With the Crooked Horn" – 5:37
"The Ewie wi' the Crookit Horn"
"The Ashplant"
 "Johsefin's Waltz" – 3:35
 "Bela's Tune" – 4:57
 "The Silver Spear" – 4:16
"The Silver Spear"
"The Glen Road to Carrick"
"Lad O'Beirne's Reel"
 "Minnie & Alex's Reel" – 2:35
 "My Love, Cape Breton and Me" – 5:49
"My Love, Cape Breton and Me"
"Prayer for Peace Waltz"

Personnel
 Philip Aaberg - piano
 Darol Anger - octave violin, arranger
 Larry Atamanuik - drums
 Sam Bacco - percussion
 Alison Brown - banjo
 John R. Burr - synthesizer 
 Sam Bush - mandolin
 John Chiasson - bass
 John Cowan - vocals
 Tracey Dares - piano
 Brad Davidge - guitar
 Jerry Douglas - resonator guitar
 Béla Fleck - banjo
 Matt Flinner - mandolin
 George Hebert - guitar 
 Byron House - bass
 Viktor Krauss - bass
 Matt MacIsaac - bagpipes, small pipes, electric pipes, whistle
 Mike Marshall - mandolin
 Edgar Meyer - bass, arranger
 Todd Phillips - bass
 Bob Quinn - piano
 Kate Quinn - vocals
 Gordie Sampson - guitar
 Bryan Sutton - guitar
 Victor Wooten - bass

References

 

Natalie MacMaster albums
2003 albums